Farlowella acus is the type species of the armored catfish genus Farlowella. Members of this genus are commonly known as twig catfish or whiptail catfish. The specific name of the species, acus, means “pointed” or a “needle” or “spine”.

Distribution
Farlowella acus is native to South America, where it occurs in the drainage basins of Lake Valencia and the Torito River in Venezuela.

Appearance and anatomy
Farlowella acus reaches  SL. The coloration of the species ranges from olive-green to yellow-brown with yellowish undersides. A very distinct irregular dark band, often beset with blotches, extends from the head to the root of the tail. The fins are transparent and the rays have dark spots. Each caudal lobe is normally with a dark band. Males' snout or rostrum is broader than the females'. When mature, the male's rostrum becomes adorned with small bristles known as odontodes. The females' thinner snouts will remain smooth at all times.

Ecology
These fish feed on plants and roots. Twig catfishes spawn from between November and March.

In the aquarium

F. acus is one of the most commonly exported species of Farlowella for the aquarium. Twig catfishes are peaceful and sociable bottom dwellers and can be kept in most freshwater community tanks without problems, either as a single pet or as a group. It thrives best in a tank of at least 24 inches (60 cm) or 35 gallons, and should be provided with plenty of shelter such as bogwood pieces, vine roots, vertical twigs or slender plant stems to allow natural behavior. However, twig catfishes do not handle sudden or large amounts of water changes very well. They easily succumb to the shock of such an action. Therefore, a few small water changes per week with aged water are recommended in order to avoid stress. The water pH should be neutral with the temperature maintained between 72–77 °F. This fragile fish should be kept in a well-filtered aquarium with other quiet tankmates such as small characins (tetras), rasboras, or Corydoras catfish. Aggressive fish such as barbs, cichlids, and larger catfishes should be avoided.

Feeding
These fish will primarily feed on algae and vegetable laden wafers or tablets; though they might accept worms or such meatier fare, they do not do well on this type of diet. It is quite difficult to get a right balance in feeding these species because of their herbivorous preference.

Breeding
Twig catfish can be induced to breed at any time, if in good condition, in captivity. In the aquarium the male will clean a hard surface (usually the aquarium wall) and the female lays its eggs at night or early morning. The female normally lays a clutch of about 60 to 80 eggs on this surface. During the incubation period the male tends to the eggs with its mouth and by fanning them with his pectoral fins. The eggs will hatch after 6 to 10 days, depending on the temperature. Newly hatched larvae will quickly feed on any organic or plant material and micro bacteria found in an established tank but can also be provided with cucumber, squashed peas, lettuce and courgette (zucchini) as daily supplements.

References

acus
Fish of South America
Taxa named by Rudolf Kner
Fish described in 1853